Fixed is the second extended play (EP) by American industrial rock band Nine Inch Nails. It was released on December 7, 1992, by Nothing, TVT, and Interscope Records. It serves as a companion release to Broken (1992), and includes remixes by Coil, Danny Hyde, JG Thirlwell, and Butch Vig, as well as then-live band member Chris Vrenna.

Fixed charted in New Zealand and Canada in 1993 and was certified platinum by the British Phonographic Industry (BPI) on March 1, 1995.

Background and content

According to Trent Reznor, Nine Inch Nails frontman and, at the time, sole member, Fixed was not intended to be a remix album, but instead a reinterpretation and deconstruction of the music found on the 1992 EP Broken, where the songs were in their "proper form".

After Reznor hired Peter Christopherson of Coil to direct the accompanying film to Broken, they developed a friendship. Shortly after, Reznor asked Christopherson to contribute to Fixed. JG Thirlwell and Butch Vig were also recruited for the remixing effort. Thirwell's second "Wish" remix, "Fist Fuck", features samples of Timothy Leary while the final track, "Screaming Slave", contains various samples of Bob Flanagan being tortured that were recorded during the filming of the "Happiness in Slavery" music video. Ultimately, Vig's contributions were minimal, relegated to the ending passage of "Throw This Away". About the experience, Vig said, "I started recording a lot of new parts, and took it in a much different direction. When it was finished, Trent thought the front part of the mix didn't fit the EP, so he just used the ending." Reznor and Chris Vrenna completed many of the remixes in-house.

Musically, Fixed is a dark, industrial, and noisy EP. Much of Brokens heavy metal aspects are eschewed and replaced with more beat- and drum-focused sounds. Tape manipulation, unusual noises, and a focus on grinding repetition define Fixed as a distinctly experimental release.

Uncoiled and Recoiled
After Christopherson and John Balance, the two members of Coil who worked on Fixed, died, Danny Hyde released a number of outtakes from the remix EP, the "Closer to God" (1994) single, and the Further Down the Spiral (1995) remix album onto torrent websites. This initial leak was titled Uncoiled, and a later semi-official release through Cold Spring was called Recoiled. Both of these releases feature alternate mixes of "Gave Up" from Fixed.

Critical reception

In his review of Fixed, AllMusic writer Peter J. D'Angelo said, "Even though Nine Inch Nails was thrust into the mainstream spotlight, this record shows the group returning to its roots and creating a daring new translation of songs that were pummeling from the start." D'Angelo concluded his review by writing that Fixed is "an impressive feat and a necessary counterpoint to an important record."

Track listing

PersonnelNine Inch Nails Trent Reznor – writing, performing, production, remixing (3, 4, 6)Remixing personnel Peter Christopherson – remixing (1)
 John Balance – remixing (1)
 Danny Hyde – remixing (1)
 JG Thirlwell – remixing (2, 5)
 Paul Kendall – additional electronics (3)
 Chris Vrenna – remixing (3, 4, 6)
 Butch Vig – ending sequence (4)
 Bill Kennedy – remixing (6)
 Martin Brumbach – remixing (6)
 Sean Beavan – remixing (6)
 Bob Flanagan – remixing (6)Additional personnel'''
 Gary Talpas – sleeve design, photography
 Tom Baker – mastering

 Charts 
 Weekly charts 

 Year-end charts 

Certifications

|+Certifications for Fixed'' by Nine Inch Nails

References

Further reading

External links
 

1992 EPs
1992 remix albums
Albums produced by Trent Reznor
Atlantic Records EPs
Atlantic Records remix albums
Interscope Records EPs
Interscope Records remix albums
Nine Inch Nails EPs
Nine Inch Nails remix albums
Nothing Records EPs
Nothing Records remix albums
Remix EPs
TVT Records EPs
TVT Records remix albums